Koyamacalia was a genus of East Asian plants in the groundsel tribe Senecioneae within the daisy family Asteraceae. It is a synonym of the accepted genus Parasenecio.

The genus name Koyamacalia is in honour of Hiroshige Koyama, a Japanese botanist and specialist of Asteraceae.

Former species
According to Global Compositae Checklist:
 Koyamacalia adenostyloides (Franch. & Sav. ex Fr. & Sav.) H.Rob. & Brettell - Japan
 Koyamacalia delphiniifolia (Siebold & Zucc.) H.Rob. & Brettell - Japan, Guizhou, Yunnan
 Koyamacalia farfarifolia (Siebold & Zucc.) H.Rob. & Brettell
 Koyamacalia nikomontana (Matsum.) H.Rob. & Brettell
 Koyamacalia pseudotaimingasa (Nakai) H.Rob. & Brettell - Japan
 Koyamacalia yatabei (Matsumura & Koidz.) H.Rob. & Brettell - Japan

The genus and all its species are now listed as synonyms of Parasenecio .

References

Flora of temperate Asia
Asteraceae genera
Historically recognized angiosperm genera
Senecioneae